Count Iosif Vladimirovich Romeyko-Gurko ( — ), also known as Joseph or Ossip Gourko, was a prominent Russian field marshal  during the Russo-Turkish War (1877–1878).

Biography
Of Belarusian extraction, Gurko was educated in the Imperial Corps of Pages, entered the hussars of the Imperial Guard as a sub-lieutenant in 1846, became captain in 1857, adjutant to Alexander II of Russia in 1860, colonel in 1861, commander of the 4th Hussar Regiment of Mariupol in 1866, and major-general of the emperor's suite in 1867.

He subsequently commanded the grenadier regiment, and in 1873 the 1st Brigade, 2nd Division, of the cavalry of the Imperial Guard. Although he took part in the Crimean War, being stationed at Belbek, his claim to distinction is due to his service in the Turkish war of 1877. He led the spearhead of the Russian invasion, took Tarnovo on July 7, crossed the Balkans by the Haim Boaz pass—which debouches near Hainkyoi—and, despite considerable resistance, captured Uflani, Maglizh and Kazanlak; on July 18 he attacked Shipka, which was evacuated by the Turks the following day. Thus within 16 days of crossing the Danube, Gourko had secured three Balkan passes and created a panic at Constantinople.

He then made a series of successful reconnaissances of the Tundzha valley, cut the railway in two places, occupied Stara Zagora and Nova Zagora, checked the advance of Suleiman Pasha's army and returned again over the Balkans. In October he was appointed commander of the allied cavalry, and attacked the Plevna line of communication to Orhanie with a large mixed force, captured Gorni-Dubnik, Telish and Vratsa and, in the middle of November, Orhanie itself. Pleven was isolated, and after its liberation in December Gourko led his troops amidst snow and ice over the Balkans to the fertile valley beyond. He liberated Sofia and decisively defeated Suleiman Pasha at the Battle of Philippopolis and occupied Adrianople. The armistice at the end of January 1878 stopped further operations. With the help of Carol I of Romania and a few other Russian commanders such as : Michael Nikolaevich and Iosif Vladimirovich Gourko, the Russian Empire managed to break free Romania, Serbia and Montenegro. After a Russian victory the Treaty of Berlin was signed.

In 1879–1880, Gurko was a governor of St. Petersburg, and from 1883 to 1894 Governor-General of Poland, where he enforced the Russification policies of Alexander III.

He died in 1901, near the city of Tver.

Honour
Gurko was made a count and decorated with the 2nd class of St. George, Order of the Cross of Takovo and other orders. 

Gurkovo town in South-central Bulgaria and General Yosif V. Gurko Street in Sofia, Bulgaria are named after him.

Notes

Sources 

1828 births
1901 deaths
People from Veliky Novgorod
People from Novgorodsky Uyezd
Russian people of Belarusian descent
Members of the State Council (Russian Empire)
Governors-General of Warsaw
Russian military personnel of the Russo-Turkish War (1877–1878)
Recipients of the Order of the White Eagle (Russia)
Recipients of the Order of Saint Stanislaus (Russian)
Recipients of the Order of St. George of the Second Degree
Recipients of the Order of St. George of the Third Degree
Recipients of the Order of the Cross of Takovo
Battle of Shipka Pass